Bordet may make reference to:

People
 Gustavo Bordet, Argentine governor
 Jules Bordet, Belgian immunologist and microbiologist
 Michel Bordet, French playwright
 Robert d'Aguiló, Norman knight, also known as Robert Bordet

Medicine
 Bordet–Gengou agar, a type of agar plate
 The Wassermann test, also known as the Bordet–Wassermann test

Places
 Bordet railway station in Belgium
 Institut Jules Bordet, hospital and university in Belgium